The Columbus City Council is the lawmaking body of Columbus, Ohio. It has 7 members who are elected at-large.  It meets in the City Council Chambers located on the second floor of Columbus City Hall. Starting in the 2023 election, City Council will expand to 9 members and be elected by district in a primary election and then at large in the November general election. In the 2023 election, all members will run for another term. Four members will only serve a two-year term while the other five will serve a four-year term.

Columbus City Council members 
The members of Columbus City Council are:

 Shannon G. Hardin: Council President
 Nicholas J. Bankston
 Rob Dorans
 Shayla D. Favor
 Emmanuel V. Remy
 Lourdes Barroso de Padilla
 Mitchell Brown

See also 
 Government of Columbus, Ohio

References

External links 
 

Government of Columbus, Ohio
Ohio city councils